XEBA-FM is a radio station on 97.1 FM in Guadalajara, Jalisco, Mexico. The station is owned by Radiópolis and broadcasts its La Ke Buena grupera format from a tower atop Cerro del Cuatro.

History
XEBA-FM received its first concession on April 9, 1968. Its concessionaire, Radio Tapatía, S.A. de C.V., also owned XEBA-AM 820 before selling it to NTR.

On November 8, 2017, the IFT authorized the relocation of XEBA-FM and XEHL-FM to Cerro del Cuatro.

References

Radio stations in Guadalajara
Radio stations established in 1968
Radiópolis